Sir Alok Kumar Sharma  (born 7 September 1967) is a British politician who served as President for COP26 from 2021 to 2022, having previously served as Secretary of State for Business, Energy and Industrial Strategy from 2020 to 2021. Sharma has been Conservative Member of Parliament (MP) for Reading West since 2010.

Sharma served in Theresa May's government as Minister of State for Housing from 2017 to 2018 and as Parliamentary Under-Secretary of State for Employment from 2018 to 2019. In 2019, he was appointed to Boris Johnson's cabinet as Secretary of State for International Development. In the 2020 cabinet reshuffle he was promoted to being Secretary of State for Business, Energy and Industrial Strategy, an office in which he served until 2021. Sharma was President of the 2021 United Nations Climate Change Conference (COP26) and negotiated the Glasgow Climate Pact.

Early life and career
Sharma was born in Agra, Uttar Pradesh, India, and moved to Reading with his parents when he was five years old. He had a Hindu upbringing. His father, Prem, was involved in Conservative politics in Reading, and became chairman of the Berkshire area of Conservatives before helping to establish the Conservative Friends of India.

Sharma was brought up in the Reading suburbs of Earley and Whitley Wood and attended Presentation College, Reading Blue Coat School in Sonning and the University of Salford, from where he graduated with a BSc in Applied Physics with Electronics in 1988.

He subsequently qualified as a chartered accountant, training with Deloitte Haskins & Sells in Manchester before moving into corporate finance advisory with Nikko Securities and then the Swedish Skandinaviska Enskilda Banken, where he held senior roles based in London, Stockholm and Frankfurt. Sharma was an adviser to clients in the corporate and private-equity sector on cross-border mergers and acquisitions, listings and restructurings.

Sharma is a governor of a local primary school in Reading. Previously he served as a chairman of the political think-tank the Bow Group's Economic Affairs Committee.

Political career

Member of Parliament
Sharma was selected as the Conservative Party candidate for the Reading West constituency in 2006. He was elected as the MP for Reading West in the 2010 general election, winning a majority of 6,004 after the retirement of the Labour MP Martin Salter.

In the 2015 general election he was re-elected with an increased majority of 6,650.

In the 2017 general election, he won his seat with a reduced majority of 2,876. On being re-elected, Sharma wrote on his website: "Having grown up locally in Reading and being very much a local Reading man, I am delighted to have been re-elected for a constituency in my home town".

In the 2019 general election Sharma increased his majority to 4,117.

Early parliamentary career (2010–2016)
Sharma served as a member of the Science and Technology Select Committee between July 2010 and February 2011 and the Treasury Select Committee between September 2014 and March 2015.

Sharma was Conservative Party Vice-Chairman from 2012 to 2015 and co-chairman of Conservative Friends of India in 2014.

In September 2011, Sharma was appointed Parliamentary Private Secretary (PPS) to Mark Hoban, the then Financial Secretary to the Treasury. During his time as a PPS, Sharma sat on a number of public bill committees including two finance bills, the 2013 Banking Reform Bill and the 2011 Pensions Bill. He also served as PPS to Sir Oliver Letwin, the former Chancellor of the Duchy of Lancaster, who had overall responsibility for the Cabinet Office.

Following the death of two cyclists in Purley on Thames, Sharma campaigned in 2014 for longer prison sentences for those convicted of death by dangerous driving. Sharma initiated a Parliamentary debate on the issue and backed a petition, started by the families of victims, which gained more than 55,000 signatures.

Sharma campaigned to reduce the number of first-class carriages on trains operating on the Great Western route between Reading and London. In January 2015, he held a meeting with Rail Minister Claire Perry and First Great Western managing director Mark Hopwood to discuss proposals to increase Standard Class capacity to reduce overcrowding.

In 2016, Sharma was appointed as the Prime Minister's "Infrastructure Envoy to India".

Junior minister (2016–2019)

Sharma was Parliamentary Under Secretary of State at the Foreign and Commonwealth Office from July 2016 to June 2017.

In June 2017 he was appointed Housing Minister, replacing Gavin Barwell, who lost his seat in the 2017 general election.

As the Minister of State for Housing, Sharma was responsible for the Government's response to the Grenfell Tower fire. He attracted media attention when he was visibly moved while making a statement to the House of Commons on 5 July 2017.

In January 2018, he became the Minister of State for Employment.

Secretary of State for International Development (2019–2020)

Sharma was appointed Secretary of State for International Development by Boris Johnson following the resignation of Rory Stewart in July 2019. Upon assuming the role, he said: "I am delighted... We will work across the whole of government to deliver Brexit and make sure the United Kingdom's aid is tackling global challenges that affect us all".

In October, Sharma stated he wanted to use the United Kingdom's leverage over the World Bank to focus the use of the nineteenth International Development Association fund on fighting climate change, building sustainable economies and promoting women's rights.

Secretary of State for Business, Energy and Industrial Strategy (2020–2021)
Following the dismissal of Andrea Leadsom in the 2020 cabinet reshuffle, Sharma was appointed to the position of Secretary of State for Business, Energy and Industrial Strategy, taking office on 13 February.

As Secretary of State, Sharma was one of the government's speakers at the daily coronavirus pandemic briefings from Downing Street. In June 2020, he appeared visibly unwell while delivering a statement in the House of Commons. Although he underwent a test for COVID-19 which came back negative, the situation led to questions being raised about the government's decision to end the use of the virtual parliament and make MPs return to the House of Commons chamber. Certain employees of the Department for Business, Energy and Industrial Strategy were advised not to return to their work by the Public and Commercial Services Union, who said that there was a lack of evidence that the department had provided enough preventative measures against the virus.

In July 2020, Sharma instructed officials to purchase half of OneWeb, a satellite communications company, for $500 million. The company was purchased from Chapter 11 bankruptcy by the United Kingdom's government and Bharti Enterprises.

With the help of Lord Callanan, Sharma introduced the National Security and Investment Act 2021 to Parliament.

President for COP26 (2021–2022)

In addition to his appointment as Secretary of State for Business, Energy and Industrial Strategy on 13 February 2020, Sharma was also appointed President of the 2021 United Nations Climate Change Conference (COP26), following the dismissal of Claire Perry O'Neill in January 2020. At that time the conference was planned for November 2020; in May 2020 it was rearranged for November 2021. The Glasgow Climate Pact was negotiated at the conference under Sharma's Presidency.

On 8 January 2021, Sharma left his position as Secretary of State to become President of COP26 on a full-time basis, and chair of the Climate Action Implementation Committee. He moved to the Cabinet Office and retained his status as a full member of the cabinet. Sharma formally served as a Minister of State in the Cabinet Office.

Amid the July 2022 Conservative Party leadership election, Sharma threatened to resign if the winning candidate did not remain committed to the UK's net zero targets. He was reappointed to his role by the Truss ministry on 6 September 2022. Upon the appointment of Rishi Sunak as Prime Minister, Sharma retained the Presidency for COP26 but was removed from cabinet.

Sharma was appointed Knight Commander of the Order of St Michael and St George (KCMG) in the 2023 New Year Honours for services to tackling climate change.

Political positions

Free schools
Sharma supported the opening in his Reading West constituency of one of the first free schools in England: All Saints Junior School opened in September 2011 and received an 'outstanding' rating in its first Ofsted report.

Sharma has also been appointed a patron of the Wren School, a new secondary free school opening in west Reading in September 2015. Sharma supported the West Reading Education Network in getting the new school approved and is helping the school to find an appropriate permanent site.

Heathrow Airport
Sharma has been a vocal supporter of the expansion of Heathrow Airport and has spoken in support of increasing the number of airport runways in the South East of England, claiming that "a lack of hub capacity is costing the United Kingdom jobs and investment". This is despite opposition in his own constituency. In 2009 he had opposed the third runway for the envionmentally unsustainable way it was being planned and had said: "A third runway at Heathrow would inflict huge damage to the environment and to the quality of life of millions of people. It is time for the government to abandon its plans for a third runway and, if a conservative government is elected, we will certainly stop this environmental disaster". He has argued that the expansion needs to be environmentally sustainable.

East West Leaders' Forum

Sharma set up the East West Leaders' Forum, a discussion forum between business leaders, to promote dialogue between the European Union, India and China. Theresa May, then Home Secretary, gave the keynote speech at the inaugural event, held in London in September 2014.

Brexit
Sharma supported the United Kingdom remaining within the European Union prior to the 2016 referendum. He backed Prime Minister Theresa May's Brexit withdrawal agreement in early 2019, and subsequently supported Prime Minister Boris Johnson's withdrawal agreement in October 2019.

Personal life
Sharma is married and lives in Caversham, Reading, with his wife and two daughters. His wife is Swedish. Sharma took his oath in the House of Commons on the Bhagavad Gita in 2019.

Notes

References

External links

 

|-

1967 births
Living people
People from Agra
People educated at Reading Blue Coat School
Alumni of the University of Salford
British politicians of Indian descent
Conservative Party (UK) MPs for English constituencies
Members of the Parliament of the United Kingdom for Reading
Ministers of State for Housing (UK)
Members of the Parliament of the United Kingdom for English constituencies
Members of the Privy Council of the United Kingdom
UK MPs 2010–2015
UK MPs 2015–2017
UK MPs 2017–2019
UK MPs 2019–present
Knights Commander of the Order of St Michael and St George
Politicians awarded knighthoods
Indian emigrants to England
Naturalised citizens of the United Kingdom